Summit Lake is located above the tree line on the south slope of the Alaska Range between miles 192 and 196 of the Richardson Highway (AR-4).

It is glacier-fed by several creeks to the north, including Gunn Creek (which flows from the Gulkana Glacier). There are also additional creeks that feed into the lake from the west and southeast. It is also the headwaters of the Gulkana River (a main tributary of the Copper River) well known for its "Copper River Reds" salmon, which migrate in late September to spawn in Gunn Creek on the north end of the lake.

The area is known for the annual Arctic Man Summit Lake Classic ski and snow-machine race, attended by up to 13,000 visitors each April, weather permitting.

See also

 Gulkana River
 Paxson, Alaska
 Richardson Highway
 Summit Lake (Alaska)—disambiguation page

References

External links
 
 Summit Lake (Paxson): Bathymetric Map and Fishing Information (Alaska Department of Fish and Game webpage)
 Arctic Man (official website)

Alaska Range
Lakes of Alaska
Lakes of Copper River Census Area, Alaska